The Aerial Bay Islands are a group of islands in Aerial Bay in the Andaman Islands. This group belongs to the North and Middle Andaman administrative district, part of the Indian union territory of Andaman and Nicobar Islands.
Smith Island is the largest and only inhabited one.

Geography
Other major islands are Chatham island, Ross Island, Ox Island.

Administration
The Aerial Bay Islands, is part of Diglipur Taluk.

Demographics 
There are 3 villages on Smith island, with a population of 600.

References 

Archipelagoes of the Andaman and Nicobar Islands
North and Middle Andaman district